Jet Asia is a private jet operator based in Macau, China. The company is described as an air limousine service.  Jet Asia is not to be confused with Hong Kong-based private jet company, "Asia Jet".

Established in 1995, Jet Asia operates a wide range of small business jets.
Jet Asia no longer has an AOC and is moving away from the aircraft management business.

Fleet

Current Fleet
The Jet Asia fleet consists of the following aircraft (as of August 2017):

Former Fleet
The airline previously operated the following aircraft:
 1 Bombardier Global Express
 1 Bombardier Challenger 605
 6 Hawkers 
 2 Bombardier Challenger 601

See also
 List of companies of Macau

References

 Hawker picture
http://www.airliners.net/photo/Untitled-(Jet-Asia)/Canadair-CL-600-2B16-Challenger/1813133/M/

Airlines of Macau
Airlines established in 1995
1995 establishments in Macau